Happy Magic: Smile Project is the fifth studio album by Japanese pop singer Aya Ueto. It was released on July 15, 2009 on Pony Canyon.

Background
Happy Magic: Smile Project is Ueto's first original album in over three years. It features songs written and composed by artists including Kohmi Hirose, Tortoise Matsumoto (from Ulfuls), Ryoji (from Ketsumeishi), Kiroro, Shintarō Tokita (from Sukimaswitch), and Hitomi Yaida as well as a cover of Begin's "Smile". The album was released in two formats: limited CD + DVD + photo book edition and standard CD-only edition. The standard edition features eleven tracks, including the two singles "Way to Heaven" and "Namida no Niji". These two songs are omitted from the limited edition CD, however the DVD includes their music videos. Despite "Save Me" being an A-side, it was not included in the album.

Chart performance
Happy Magic: Smile Project peaked at #14 on the Oricon Daily Albums Chart and debuted at #20 on the Weekly Albums Chart with 7,648 copies sold. The album charted for a total of five weeks and sold over 11,000 copies.

Track listing

Charts and sales

References

2009 albums
Aya Ueto albums
Pony Canyon albums